The Henry Steel Olcott Memorial Cricket Tournament is conducted annually among the past cricketers of eight premier Buddhist schools in Sri Lanka in honour of Col. Olcott, the founder of Buddhist education in Sri Lanka. The organising function in each year is rotated among each the participating Old Boy Associations

Beginning
This cricket tournament was started in 1999 following the 75th Anniversary Celebrations of Nalanda College Colombo. About this time, groups of former students from Nalanda, Dharmaraja and Ananda met informally in the evenings at the Bloomfield Cricket Club. It was during one of these gatherings that the idea of a limited over tournament among the Old Boys of the cricket-playing Buddhist Schools was proposed by the 1st Test Captain of Sri Lanka, Bandula Warnapura of Nalanda. Accordingly, the first tournament of the series was held by the Old Nalandian Sports Club on 12 December 1999 at the Nalanda College Grounds.

Participants
Ananda College, Colombo
Dharmaraja College, Kandy
Dharmasoka College, Ambalangoda
Dharmapala Vidyalaya, Pannipitiya
Maliyadeva College, Kurunegala
Mahinda College, Galle 
Nalanda College Colombo
Rahula College, Matara.

Past Venues and Winners

External links
Ananda Net
Battle of the Maroons

References

Sri Lankan domestic cricket competitions
Recurring sporting events established in 1999